General San Martín Department is a  department of Córdoba Province in Argentina.

The provincial subdivision has a population of about 116,107 inhabitants in an area of 5,006 km2, and its capital city is Villa María, which is located around 600 km from Buenos Aires.

Settlements

Arroyo Algodón
Arroyo Cabral
Ausonia
Chazón
Etruria
La Laguna
La Palestina
La Playosa
Luca
Pasco
Silvio Pellico
Ticino
Tío Pujio
Villa María
Villa Nueva

Departments of Córdoba Province, Argentina